The Renfe classes 319.2, 319.3 and 319.4 are six axle Co'Co' medium power mainline diesel-electric locomotives manufactured by Macosa using General Motors Electromotive division components under license.

Background and design

The first GM mainline locomotives in Spain were the Renfe Class 1900 locomotives, introduced in the mid 1960s, built in both America, and under license by Macosa; over one hundred were built and these were later given the numbers 319-001 to 319-103. In the 1980s the company started to upgrade its diesel fleet; the original class 319s began to be scrapped and a new version, twenty of which, were constructed, forming the sub-class 319.2 with numbers running from 319.201 upwards.

The new locomotive continued the GM-EMD tradition using the same engine and bogies but with other components completely new such as the generator. Opinions differ as to whether or not the locomotives represented a re-build or conversion of the old class. However some of the old components from the earlier locomotives were reused.

A trial of 20 locomotives was produced, and resulted in eventually 108 locomotives of the being built in total.

The first locomotives were constructed between 1984–5 and were numbered 319.201 to 319.220, these had three windows in the front of the cabin, and as a result got the nickname Retales (meaning 'patchwork' from retal a scrap, piece or oddment). Most were painted in grey/blue/yellow colour scheme, and later received the grey/yellow 'Taxi' colour scheme. Two units also received a brown, yellow and orange livery named Estrella. The machines worked well, and a further 20 locomotives were built in between 1990 and 1991 by Meinfesa, to the same electro-mechanical design but with two pane front windows and different body shape, the locomotives also had an air-conditioning unit fitted as standard into the design. These 58 machines formed the sub-class 319.2. 8 of the units were built for AVE with 1435mm gauge running gear (219.241 to 219.248) and received the white/grey AVE livery, the remainder received the standard freight yellow/grey 'Taxi' livery.

A second series of 40 locomotives, 319.3 were built between 1991–2 with an additional electrical generator for electrical train supply and a higher operating speed for passenger train services. The diesel engines had a higher engine bore helping to provide the additional 300 kW power required by the auxiliary generator, and the additional demands of higher speeds. The locomotives were delivered in standard grey/yellow livery but many subsequently received the blue and white liveries of the Grandes Lineas Altaria and Arco passenger services.

The final  sub-class 319.4 were made in 1992; built for freight work with non head end power, the locomotives differed from all previous versions, replacing electromechanical speed control with more advanced microprocessor controlled anti-wheel slip control (described by GM-EMD as super-series control) working in conjunction with speed sensing ground radar. Externally the locomotives are indistinguishable from the earlier version. All were given the standard freight 'Taxi' blue and grey with large numerals livery.

Work history

The sub-classes 319.2 and 319.4 worked primarily on freight trains, in multiple on heavier trains, some of the 319.2 series were also used, fitted with standard gauge wheelsets on the construction of the first AVE line between Madrid and Seville.

The class 319.3 initially worked on passenger services, as designed, but have been displaced due to their relatively low power. By 2004 5 had been assigned to infrastructure trains.

One unit fitted with Siemens equipment was used for testing on the installation of ETCS on the Madrid to Barcelona to France high speed line.

Exports

Argentina
Fifty three of the 319 class along with ~100 diesel multiple units, over one hundred and thirty Talgo carriages, as well as over one hundred carriages and vans were sold to the Ministry of Transport of Argentina in a sale worth €120million. The vehicles were acquired for its Plan Nacional de Recuperación Ferroviaria de Argentina, part of a countrywide development investment plan worth $111billion.

By 2010 over twenty of the class had been shipped, with some still undergoing overhaul in preparation. In Argentina the locomotives have been used for the Línea San Martín (LSM).

Saudi Arabia
In 2014 several class 319 were transferred to the Saudi Railways Organization.

Miniature models
In HO scale Roco has produced the different variants of the subclass 319.2, as well as the 319.3 and 319.4 subclasses. The original single cab "american" version has also been produced in HO scale.

In N scale Startrain has produced subclasses 319.2, 319.3 and 319.4.

References

Images and videos

External links
Serie 319, brief description and images, Jorge Sanz Mongay, www.jorges.arrakis.es
RENFE 319, GM Locomotives in Europe, images, Lolke Bijlsma, www.lolkebijlsma.com
EMD Locomotives in Spain personales.ya.com

Railway locomotives introduced in 1984
Diesel locomotives of Spain
319 later
Macosa/Meinfesa/Vossloh Espana locomotives
Electro-Motive Diesel locomotives
Standard gauge locomotives of Spain
5 ft 6 in gauge locomotives
Diesel-electric locomotives of Spain